Živorad "Žika" Petrović (1939 – 25 April 2000) was a Serbian engineer and business executive. He was assassinated in the spring of 2000. At the time of his death, Petrović was the CEO of Serbian flag carrier Jat Airways. The crime remains unsolved to this day.

Petrović graduated from the University of Belgrade's Faculty of Transport in 1968. He became Jat's CEO in 1992.

He was a member of the Socialist Party of Serbia (SPS), a political party headed at the time by Slobodan Milošević.

Murder
On Tuesday night, 25 April 2000, around 21:30 CET, Petrović was killed by unknown assassin(s) in front of his parents' home at 20 Jaša Prodanović Street in Belgrade. Petrović was reportedly parking his JAT-issued metallic gray Audi in front of the house when two assailants killed him from behind with four bullets to the head and back. B92 reporter on the scene counted five bullet shells, while Blic reported that more than ten bullets were fired at Petrović. The killers likely used a silencer as nobody in the area reported hearing any gun noise. According to neighbours, the police showed up very quickly after the murder and blocked off the street. Radomir Marković, the head of the State Security Service, came to the crime scene as well.

The case remains unsolved.

Reaction
Due to Petrović's position, longtime CEO of a large state-owned enterprise, as well as his political connections through SPS party, the murder sparked a lot of domestic and international reaction and press coverage.

State
Serbian Ministry of the Interior put out a press release saying: "This is undeniably a terrorist act committed against a high-ranking official of FR Yugoslavia's state-economy. The police is undertaking intense investigative measures to apprehend those that carried out this crime".

Serbian Minister of Justice Dragoljub Janković called Petrović's murder a "foreign-imported state terrorism of the very specific kind". He continued: "This is a perfidious attempt at destabilizing the current authorities. One of many similar attempts at tearing down the state institutions that we're seeing around us these days, including the street protests, media interference, and now even executions of state officials. The idea on the part of those who order these acts is clearly to create suspicion, panic, and lack of confidence in the system and authority among the people. The implicit message is probably that some other individuals could come in and bring some order in this area. The fact that these events are thought up and imported from abroad is further making it difficult for our institutions. As is the fact that local unofficial institutions and certain media outlets are taking this side. What's left is the old adage - the justice is slow, but reachable".

Opposition
Opposition figures also chimed in. Nebojša Čović, president of the Democratic Alternative (DA), said: "Because of this murder, the minister of the interior Vlajko Stojiljković should immediately resign. It's absurd that in Serbia we've never had more policemen, and yet our citizens have never been less safe and secure".

Momčilo Perišić, president of the Movement for Democratic Serbia (PDS), said that he "knew Petrović personally, though not well enough to speculate on the motives behind his murder", adding: "If the police called this a terrorist act, it means that they're admitting there's terror in Serbia. And if there is terror in Serbia, they're not doing their job properly. I'm afraid our institutions aren't up to the task and that there are certain parallel institutions of sorts created for one-off purposes, such as media intimidation among other things. These parallel institutions have broken free and are now endangering those that created them in the first place".

Foreign
Western publications speculated about the reasons for Petrović's murder, especially in light of the fact that it came amidst a 2000 crime wave during which many prominent figures in the country got assassinated including mobsters Željko "Arkan" Ražnatović (15 January), Radoslav "Bata Trlaja" Trlajić (25 February), Branislav "Dugi" Lainović (20 March), Zoran "Ćanda" Davidović (23 March), and Zoran "Skole" Uskoković (27 April), politicians Pavle Bulatović (7 February 2000) and Ivan Stambolić (25 August 2000), even two unsuccessful attempts on the life of opposition politician Vuk Drašković.

See also
List of unsolved murders

References

1939 births
2000 deaths
2000 murders in Serbia
20th-century Serbian businesspeople
Assassinated Serbian people
Assassinations in Serbia
Male murder victims
Burials in Požarevac
People from Požarevac
People murdered in Serbia
University of Belgrade alumni
Unsolved murders in Serbia